Leatherbarrow is an English surname. Notable people with the surname include:

Charlie Leatherbarrow (1870–1940), English footballer
David Leatherbarrow, American architecture writer
Linda Leatherbarrow, Scottish writer and illustrator
Scott Leatherbarrow (born 1990), English rugby league player

English-language surnames